Machel Jesus Montano (born 24 November 1974) is a Trinidadian soca singer, actor, record producer and songwriter. Known for his high energy, fast-paced, and often unpredictable on-stage performances, he is one of the genre’s most popular artists.

Music career 
Montano is the front-man of the soca band The HD Family. In 1987 he was the youngest finalist to ever win the Caribbean Song Festival. His career spans more than 30 years. Around 2012 he moved to the Los Angeles area. He is very well known in New York City, where he has had sold-out concerts in Madison Square Garden many times over. Machel is a six time international Soca Monarch.

Early life 
Montano was born in Carenage (Northwestern Trinidad) on 24 November 1974 and his family moved to Siparia (Southwestern Trinidad), when he was very young. He attended Siparia Boys R.C., then Presentation College, a prestigious secondary school in San Fernando, where he was in the choir led by Mrs Cynthia Lee-Mack. Machel's first shot to fame as a nine-year-old boy came with the song "Too Young To Soca" while he was still in primary school. In 1984, along with his older brother Marcus and neighbours, the group Panasonic Express was started and, in 1989, the band became Xtatik. In April 1986, at the age of 11, Montano appeared on the mainstream television show Star Search. In 1987, he took part in the Trinidad and Tobago National Song Writers Festival, and placed second with his song "Dream Girl". He also won the Caribbean Song Festival in Barbados, becoming the first Trinidadian and youngest contestant to win this competition.

Machel Montano HD – concepts 

The band developed and was re-invented by its leader Montano several times, including as The Xtatik Circus, Xtatik The Road Marching Band and The Band of the Year. Since 2007 they have been known as Machel Montano HD (High Definition); Montano promoted the concept by saying that he is the first human being to go HD. He claims this characterizes the evolution of his music over the past 25 years and the highly improved style in which his music is presented to his fans in radio format, television, and during live performances. He is part of a campaign in Trinidad and Tobago to promote safe driving – "Arrive Alive". Part of the hype surrounding Montano since 2007 is his HD tour bus, a 20-year-old bus from the Public Transport Service Corporation (PTSC) that was re-done and includes a bedroom, bathroom facilities, flat-screen TVs, Internet access and expensive audio systems. After its debut in 2007, the bus was re-painted for 2008, the new images of Machel matching various photos from the album artwork of his 2008 CD, Flame On. The bus featured heavily in his videos for "Jumbie" (2007) and "Rollin/Blazin d Trail" (2008). In 2012 Montano won the Road March, Power Soca Monarch and the Groovy Soca Monarch. He won the Groovy Soca Monarch with his rendition of "Mr. Fete". In May 2012 he launched the music video to his hit single "Bottle Of Rum".

Xtatik's music 
Kernal Roberts, son of the late calypsonian Lord Kitchener, has taken up the role of Xtatik's drummer and musical director.

In the United Kingdom, he co-presented the International Sounds of Soca show on the BBC's black music digital radio station BBC Radio 1Xtra for four years with DJ Slic. His successful singles, with and without Xtatik, include "Big Truck" (Xtatik's most successful single, which won the Road March title in 1997), "Outa Space" (with Beenie Man), "Music Farm" (Xtatik), "It's Carnival" (with Destra Garcia), and his Road March title wins in 2006, "Band Of The Year" (with Patrice Roberts), and in 2007, "Jumbie".

His album Flame On, released in February 2008, featured collaborations with calypso artistes David Rudder on "Oil and Music" and Mighty Sparrow on "Congo Man". Flame On also includes Clamydia with other artistes from various genres including soca, reggae, rap and reggaeton. Examples of these partnerships can be heard on the following tracks: Patrice Roberts on "Rollin", Shaggy on "Winning Season", Buju Banton on "Make Love" and finally Lil Jon and Pitbull on "Defense (The Anthem)".

On Flame On Montano's right-hand man Kernal Roberts was involved in the writing of eight out of the 13 tracks.

In Trinidad's Carnival Road March Competition for Carnival 2008, Montano's song "Blazin d Trail" placed third.

2013–19 media 
On 20 January 2013 Montano released the official video for the single "The Fog" from his 16th solo album, "Machelements". On 27 January 2013, Machel then released another video for his single "Float". Two days after another visual was released for his song "Happiest Man Alive". Other songs that were followed by immediate visuals are "Epic", taking two months to create and release, and  "Ministry of Road", taking less than one month to follow up on.

In 2014, Montano took an interest in electric dance music (EDM), collaborating with EDM artists Major Lazer to create EDM song with a Soca vibe, called "Sound Bang".

In November 2014 Montano won a Soul Train Award for Best International Performance for the song "Ministry of Road (M.O.R.)". His win for "Ministry of Road" is the second consecutive win at the BET Soul Train Music Awards for Soca Music just after Bunji Garlin won in 2013 with Differentology.

Montano made his movie debut with Bazodee (2016), which was filmed entirely in Trinidad and Tobago.  He stars in the movie as a soca singer who falls in love with a businessman's daughter.

On 21 January 2019 Montano released the single "The Road". The song features R&B Ashanti.

International Soca Monarchs 
The International Soca Monarch competition is an annual contest between various competing Soca artists. Within this competition there are two sub-categories which contestants can place in. One of which is the Power Soca Monarch; a competition for upbeat songs while the International Groovy Soca Monarch is for Soca songs of a slower tempo. In 2011, Montano won his first Soca Monarch competition (from Power Soca Monarchs) for his performance of the song "Advantage". In the years 2012 and 2013, he won back to back times in both sub-categories for his performance of his songs "Pump Yuh Flag" and "Mr. Fete", in 2012 and, "Float" and, "The Fog", in 2013, winning TT$2 Million each time. He also won the Power Soca Monarch in 2014 for his song "Ministry of Road", however he was dethroned by Kerwin Du Bois and his hit song "Too Real" in the Groovy Soca Monarch category. Montano set a new record by winning the 2014 Power Monarch, becoming the first artist/ performer to win a total of four titles. He won the title again in 2015 with his hit song "Like Ah Boss".

Personal life 
On February 14, 2020, Montano married his longtime girlfriend Renee Butcher (now Renee Montano) at Trinidad's The Red House, the first such wedding in 20 years at the country's seat of parliament, making him only the second Soca singer male or female to get married in the month of February after Alison Hinds (with whom he did a remix of her Crop Over 2007 song "Roll it Gal") who got married on February 26, 2004, he is also the only soca singer to get married on Valentine's day and the second male soca singer in the English speaking Caribbean to get married after Lil Rick of Barbados.

Discography

Solo albums 
Too Young to Soca? (1985)
Soca Earthquake (1987)
Dr. Carnival (1988)
Katch Ya! (1989)
Breakin Out! (1990)
One Step Ahead! (1991) 
2000 Young To Soca (2000 Re-Edition)
The Xtatik Parade (2004) 
The Xtatik Experience (2005)
B.O.D.Y. - Band Of D Year (2006)
The Book of Angels (2007)
Flame On, released as Winning Season in the United States (2008)
Heavenly Drum (2009)
Album 34 (2010)
The Return (2011)
Double M (2012)
Going for Gold (2012) - Machel Montano and Friends
Machelements (Volume 1) (2013)
Happiest Man Alive (2014)
Monk Monté (2015)
Monk Evolution (2016)
G.O.A.T. (2019)
The Wedding Album (2021)

Xtatik albums 
X Amount Ah Sweetnesss (1992)
Soca Style Hot (1993)
By All Means (EP) (1994)
Loose Yuh Waist (1995)
Men at Work (1996)
Heavy Duty (1997)
Xtatik Live (1997)
Charge (1998)
Any Minute Now (1999)
Here Comes the Band (2000)
Same High (2001)
On the Cusp (2002)
The Xtatik Circus (2003 – as "Xtatik Band 5.0")

Guest appearances
"Floor On Fire" by Lil' Jon featuring Pitbull and Machel Montano (2009)
"Alright" by Pitbull featuring Machel Montano (from the album Planet Pit) (2010)
"Can't Let Go" by Boyz II Men featuring Machel Montano (from the album Collide) (2014)
"Shake Yuh Bum Bum" by Timaya featuring Machel Montano (2014)
"All My Love (Remix)" by Major Lazer featuring Ariana Grande and Machel Montano (2015)
"Taxi (Carnival Remix)" by Pitbull, Lil' Jon and Machel Montano (2016)
"Issa Vibe/Pick Your Position" by Motto featuring Skinny Fabulous and Machel Montano (2019)
"Young Boy" by Calypso Rose featuring Machel Montano (2019)

References

External links 
 Machel Montano website
 BET J to air Machel Montano Trinidad & Tobago special – CaribbeanNetNews, Saturday, 24 March 2007
 Machel Montano Performs at Miami Broward Carnival 2012.

1974 births
Living people
21st-century Trinidad and Tobago male singers
21st-century Trinidad and Tobago singers
Soca musicians
20th-century Trinidad and Tobago male singers
20th-century Trinidad and Tobago singers
Trinidad and Tobago people of Grenadian descent